René Tavernier may refer to:
 René Tavernier (geologist)  (1914–1992), Belgian geologist and stratigrapher
 René Tavernier (poet) (1915–1989), French writer and philosopher